Eniram Oy, founded in 2005, is a Finnish clean-tech software engineering company which specializes in marine energy management products and services for ship-owners and operators of commercial vessels, ranging from cruise ships, bulk carriers, container ships, LNG carriers and tankers.

The company’s onboard and on-shore energy management systems provide ship-owners and operators with insight for cutting harmful emissions, increasing fuel efficiency, driving operational change and optimizing overall ship and fleet performance. 
Headquartered in Helsinki, Finland, Eniram employs software designers, naval architects and ship captains.

On 1 July 2016, Eniram was bought by the Finnish engine and maritime company Wärtsilä.

History

2005: Eniram Oy is established in Helsinki; first employees come on board.
2007: trim optimization trials with Royal Caribbean International, Norwegian Cruise Line and Carnival Cruise Lines, three of the world’s largest cruise ship companies
2008: first trim optimization deal; first container ship customer; Eniram US offices open.
2009: first tanker ship customer (trim optimization).
2010: first fleet performance offering; UK office opens.
2011: Singapore office is established, Eniram #1 on the Deloitte Fast 50 Awards list. 
2012: first speed and engine optimization customers.
2013: German offices open, expansion to Japan and Middle East
2014: Eniram named European Cleantech Company of the Decade
2016: Eniram bought by Wärtsilä.

Awards

Slush names Eniram in Top 50 companies list.
The 2014 Global Cleantech 100 Companies
Startup100 ranks Finnish startups monthly based on online marketing activities and performance. Eniram is listed in the Top 100 for October 2014
Winner of the 2014 Fathom Shipping Energy Efficiency Award
Avaus: Eniram #9 on the “Smartest Companies in Finland” list

See also

Fuel efficiency
Energy engineering

References

External links
Sulfur Regulations Spur Fuel-saving Technologies, Marine Link, Nov. 13, 2014
Interview: Attaining World Business Intelligence, World Maritime News, Oct. 7, 2014
Information Technology and Marine Software, Pacific Maritime Magazine, September, 2014
Finnish invention slashes ship emissions, Yle Uutiset, July 30, 2014
Operating in heavy fouling areas could cost cruise vessels $500,000 per year, Ship Technology, Oct. 5, 2012
Hamburg Süd to Equip More Vessels with DTA Technology, Ship Technology, Apr 26, 2011
 Eniram's website.

Engineering companies of Finland
Marine energy